Baptist General Conference of Canada (BGCC) is a national body of evangelical Baptist churches of the Swedish Baptist and Radical Pietist tradition in Canada. The districts cooperate through the General Conference and the national office is located in Edmonton, Alberta.

History
A church was formed in Quebec in 1892 and another in Winnipeg in 1894 by Swedish Baptists that emerged in Radical Pietism late in the 19th century. From its beginning among Scandinavian immigrants, the BGCC has grown to a network of autonomous churches from Vancouver Island to Nova Scotia. .The Quebec church no longer exists. The Grant Memorial Baptist Church in Winnipeg is the oldest surviving Canadian BGC church. Though organized into regional conferences, these churches were also affiliated with the Baptist Union of Western Canada (BUWC) for the first half of the 20th century. The Central Canada Baptist Conference and the Baptist General Conference in Alberta withdrew from the BUWC in 1948 and 1949, respectively. The BGCC churches were affiliated with the Baptist General Conference in the United States until 1981. Beginning in 1977, the three districts then in existence - Baptist General Conference in Alberta, British Columbia Baptist Conference and Central Canada Baptist Conference - started exploring the possibilities of working together to evangelize Canada and the world. At the second meeting of the representatives, a recommendation came to organize a General Conference. The BGCC was formed in 1981, but has roots in Swedish Baptist missionary work in Winnipeg and Quebec.

The BGC churches in Canada are organized into four district conferences (BGC Alberta, BGC Central Canada, BGC Saskatchewan, and British Columbia Baptist Conference) and another region known as Eastern Expansion which includes churches in Quebec, Nova Scotia and southern Ontario.

The Conference is led by a Board composed of members from BGC churches from the districts. The executive director oversees the Canadian office, gives missional alignment to the various national ministries and provides visionary leadership to move the Conference forward.

In 2016, Kevin Schular was appointed to a five-year term as executive director.

The Conference holds an annual meeting, held at various locations around Canada. Delegates are sent from their local church and conduct the business of the Conference. The BGCC operates a number of ministries, including the Canadian Baptist Seminary, Global Missions and Foundation, and is affiliated with the Evangelical Fellowship of Canada. According to a denomination census released in 2001, it claimed 7,137 members.

See also

Baptists in Canada

References

External links
Baptist General Conference of Canada - official Web Site

Baptist Christianity in Canada
Christian organizations established in 1981
Baptist denominations established in the 20th century
Baptist denominations in North America
Evangelical denominations in North America
Radical Pietism